A Hitch in Time may refer to:

 A Hitch in Time, a 1955 Looney Tunes animated film short
 A Hitch in Time, a 1978 British film made by the Children's Film Foundation